Miravete de la Sierra is a municipality located in the province of Teruel, Aragon, Spain. According to the 2004 census (INE), the municipality has a population of 12 inhabitants. However, interviews with local inhabitants establish that the total permanent population in winter is  47 people (according to the 2007 census); while during the summer and other holidays, many more people live there.

References

External links 
 El pueblo en el que nunca pasa nada (official Spanish language website)
 Radio interview (in Spanish) with one of the town's inhabitants, where she rebukes the "12 inhabitants" myth.

Municipalities in the Province of Teruel
Maestrazgo